Afton Township is a township in 
Howard County, Iowa, United States. During the 2010 Census it had a population of 897.

References

Howard County, Iowa
Townships in Iowa